The Polychrotidae family (sometimes classified as the Polychrotinae subfamily instead) of iguanian lizards contains the living genus Polychrus (commonly called bush anoles) and the extinct genus Afairiguana. The family Polychrotidae was once thought to encompass all anoles, including those in the genus Anolis (which are now included in the family Dactyloidae). Studies of the evolutionary relationships of anoles based on molecular information has shown that Polychrus is not closely related to Anolis, but instead closer to Hoplocercidae. It is therefore not part of Dactyloidae and instead is treated as the family, Polychrotidae.

References

 
Extant Ypresian first appearances
Lizard families
Extant Eocene first appearances